The Soldiers and Sailors Memorial Gymnasium, on the campus of Union College in Barbourville, Kentucky, was listed on the National Register of Historic Places in 1984.

It is a Colonial Revival-style building built in 1919.

It was deemed "significant as an outstanding example of Colonial Revival architecture in Southeast Kentucky and in the history of higher education in southeast, Kentucky. It is also significant because of its association with efforts in Knox County and within the Methodist Episcopal Church of Kentucky to create a fitting memorial for the Knox County and Methodist men of Kentucky who died in World War I."

See also 
 Speed Hall (1905)
 Old Classroom Building (1907)

References

World War I memorials in the United States
National Register of Historic Places in Knox County, Kentucky
Colonial Revival architecture in Kentucky
School buildings completed in 1919
Union College (Kentucky)
1919 establishments in Kentucky
University and college buildings on the National Register of Historic Places in Kentucky
Gyms in the United States